The Traikutakas were a dynasty of Indian kings who ruled between 388 and 456. The name "Traikutakas" seems to be derived from the words for a three-peaked mountain ("Tri-kuta"). The Traikutakas are mentioned in Kalidasa's Raghuvamsa, in which they are located in the area of northern Konkan. The dominions of the Traikutakas further included Aparanta and northern Maharashtra.

The coins of the Traikutaras are found extensively in southern Gujarat, and southern Maharashtra beyond the Ghats. Their design is very close to that of the Western Satraps, from which they probably inherited some territories, and traces of the obverse legend with Greek letters can still be seen.

Traikuta  rule of Aparanta or Konkan  begins in A.D. 248 (Traikuta era) exactly the time of Abhira Ishwarsena rule, hence Traikutas are identified with the dynasty of Abhiras.

The Traikutakas reckoned in a specific era, known as the Traikutaka era, or usually the Kalachuri or Chedi era, starting in 249.

History
It is generally supposed that Traikutakas were a different dynasty of Abhira, and hence are sometimes called Abhira-Traikutakas . Indradutta, Dahrasena & Vyaghrasena were well known kings from this dynasty. King Dahrasena expanded his realm, which soon bordered the Vakataka realm. This led to conflict and the Vakataka king Narendrasena, who with the help of his son & crown prince Prithivishena, probably defeated the Traikutikas, as later king Prithivishena's inscriptions refer to him twice rescuing the "sunken fortunes of his family".  

Traikutikas were known for their Vaishnava faith, who claimed to be Yadav of Haiheya branch. and Dharasena performed Ashvamedha Yajna too. During the reign of Maharaja Madhyamasena, the kingdom was invaded by the Vakataka king Harishena. The dynasty ended around AD 550, when Vikramasena, the last known king died. The Traikutakas were probably reduced to a vassal status under the Vishnukundins and had to accept Madhavavarman I's authority.

Traikutaka rulers
The following Traikuta rulers are known from the coins and inscriptions of Gupta period-  
 Maharaja Indradatta (AD 415-440, only mentioned on the coins of his son) 
 Maharaja Dahrasena, son of Indradatta (A.D. 455), he performed Ashwamedha
 Maharaja Vyaghrasena, son of Dahrasena (A.D. 480)
 Maharaja Madhyamasena
 Vikramasena

Further reading

References

References

 "A catalogue of the Indian coins in the British Museum. Andhras etc.." Rapson

History of Maharashtra
Dynasties of India